A cypherpunk anonymous remailer is a Type I anonymous remailer that takes messages encrypted with PGP or GPG, or in some cases in plain text, and forwards them removing any identifying  information from the header.

Sending a Cypherpunk message

Step 1:  Retrieving the remailer's Public Key.

Generally you can get a Cypherpunk remailer's public key by sending an email message with the subject "remailer-key" to the server you wish to use.

Step 2:  Import remailer's public keys into PGP or GPG.

Step 3:  Compose message

Compose the message in your favorite text editor, using the following template:

::
Anon-To: <Recipient Email Address>

##
Subject: <Subject>

<Message Text>

Step 4: Encrypt message

Use PGP and/or GPG to encrypt the message that you just composed using the remailer's public key.

Step 5: Send encrypted message to remailer

Prepare an email to send to the Cypherpunk remailer using the following template:

::
Encrypted: PGP

-----BEGIN PGP MESSAGE-----
<place encrypted output here>
-----END PGP MESSAGE-----

Then send it.

See also

 Anonymity
 Anonymous P2P
 Anonymous remailer
 Mixmaster anonymous remailer (Type II)
 Mixminion (Type III)
 Onion routing
 Tor (network)
 Pseudonymous remailer (a.k.a. nym servers)
 Penet remailer
 Data privacy
 Traffic analysis

Howtos and examples 
About.com: Send Email Anonymously — Chaining Remailers with PGP
Feraga.com: Howto use a Type I Anonymous Remailer (link not active 12 May 2010, see archive version)

Notes

 The extra headers are called 'pseudoheaders' because they do not appear in the RFC 822 headers specification for email.
 Messages to Cypherpunk remailers may be layered so they route through several different Cypherpunk remailers to decrease the odds of anyone determining who the sender is.
 Some Cypherpunk remailers are also Mixmaster anonymous remailers and can split long Cypherpunk messages into Mixmaster packets and send them to the next remailer, if it also understands Mixmaster.
 Many Cypherpunk remailer users will repeat steps 1-4 to wrap their message in additional layers to route it through several remailers for additional privacy and security.

Further reading

 Email Security, Bruce Schneier
 Computer Privacy Handbook, Andre Bacard

Internet Protocol based network software
Anonymity networks
Routing
Network architecture